William Warner Westenra, 7th Baron Rossmore (14 February 1931 – 4 May 2021), known as Hon. William Westenra, and nicknamed Paddy, was an Anglo-Irish noble, photographer and author.

Biography
Born at the family seat of Rossmore Castle, William Warner Westenra was educated at Scaitcliffe prep school and Eton College before reading Theology at Cambridge University. He inherited his father's title in 1958, by then his family's ancestral home had long been abandoned by this time, due to dry-rot, and they instead lived in a house on the estate. This was later destroyed by a fire started by the Irish Republican Army in 1981.

Following the end of his relationship with Marianne Faithfull, he met and married Valerie Marion Tobin, in 1982 and their son, Benedict William was born in 1983, Westenra, upon his marriage to Tobin, adopted her daughter Charlotte, whose father was Leonard Whiting. Charlotte took the Westenra family name. He continued to work as a photographer and painter for many years. He later returned to Glin Castle where he had first encountered Faithfull and her then-boyfriend, Mick Jagger, to photograph the castle for an upcoming coffee table book. 

His marriage to Valerie was dissolved, prior to his death in 2021. His son Benedict inherited the barony and assumed the title 8th Baron Rossmore upon it being proved.

References

1931 births
2021 deaths
Barons in the Peerage of Ireland
20th-century Anglo-Irish people
People educated at Eton College
Alumni of the University of Cambridge
People from County Monaghan

Rossmore